Phlegyas is a genus of true bugs in the family Pachygronthidae. There are at least three described species in Phlegyas.

Species
These three species belong to the genus Phlegyas:
 Phlegyas abbreviatus (Uhler, 1876) i c g b
 Phlegyas annulicrus Stal, 1869 i c g b
 Phlegyas patruelis Berg, C., 1883 c g
Data sources: i = ITIS, c = Catalogue of Life, g = GBIF, b = Bugguide.net

References

Lygaeoidea
Articles created by Qbugbot